Spirasigmidae is a family of sponges belonging to the order Tetractinellida.

Genera:
 Spirasigma Hallmann, 1912
 Tentorina Burton, 1959

References

Sponge families